Benjamin Matthew Luxon  (born 24 March 1937, Redruth, Cornwall) is a retired British baritone.

Biography
He studied with Walther Gruner at the Guildhall School of Music and Drama (while working part-time as a PE teacher in the East End) and established an international reputation as a singer at the age of 21 when he won the third prize at the 1961 ARD International Music Competition in Munich. Soon afterward he joined composer Benjamin Britten's English Opera Group.  On their tour of the Soviet Union in 1963, he sang the roles of Sid and Tarquinius in Britten's operas Albert Herring and The Rape of Lucretia,  respectively. In 1971, Britten composed the title role of his television opera Owen Wingrave specifically for Luxon's voice; Luxon created the role later that year with the English Opera Group.

The following year, 1972, Luxon made his début at both the Royal Opera House, Covent Garden – creating the role of the Jester in Peter Maxwell Davies' opera Taverner – and at the Glyndebourne Opera Festival, where he sang the title role in Raymond Leppard's realization of Monteverdi's Il ritorno d'Ulisse in patria. Thereafter he became a frequent guest at both venues and also at Tanglewood in Massachusetts, USA.

In 1974, Luxon began his long association with the English National Opera, which culminated in his appearance in the title role of Verdi's Falstaff in 1992. He made his Metropolitan Opera début (as Eugene Onegin) in 1980, his La Scala début in 1986, and his Los Angeles début (as Wozzeck) in 1988. He sang in most of the major European opera houses and made frequent appearances in Munich (Bayerische Staatsoper) and Vienna (Wiener Staatsoper).

In addition to his opera work, Luxon also developed a reputation as a concert-giver and recitalist with an unusually broad repertoire, ranging from early music through Lieder to contemporary song, music hall and folk music. He has also been recognised for his work rehabilitating parlour songs from the late nineteenth and early twentieth century, particularly in partnership with Robert Tear. He made several appearances on BBC TV's long-running Music Hall Variety show, The Good Old Days, both with Robert Tear and on his own. His rendition of the song 'Give Me a ticket to Heaven' always met with tremendous acclaim. It was the song for which the BBC received the largest feedback of any featured on the programme.

Luxon has made more than one hundred recordings, many featuring early and mid twentieth-century British songwriting and folksong arrangements by composers such as Britten, George Butterworth, Percy Grainger, Ivor Gurney, Roger Quilter, Ralph Vaughan Williams, Gerald Finzi and Peter Warlock. His regular accompanist between 1961 and 1999 was the pianist David Willison. As a guest on the BBC's Desert Island Discs program, he said that his favourite piece of music is Thomas Tallis's Spem in alium.

Luxon was appointed a Commander of the Order of the British Empire (CBE) in the 1986 Queen's Birthday Honours.

Starting around 1990, Luxon began to be troubled by hearing loss. Though he explored a variety of conventional and 'alternative' treatments, continued fluctuation and deterioration in his hearing forced him to end his singing career by the end of the decade. Since then, however, Luxon has developed a career as a narrator and poetry reader, whilst continuing to give master classes and direct opera. He lives in the Berkshires in Western Massachusetts in the U.S.

Operatic roles 
(Performed and/or recorded, listed alphabetically)

Selected discography

Videography
 Glyndebourne Festival Opera: a Gala Evening (1992), Arthaus Musik DVD, 100-432, 2004

References

External links
Interview with Benjamin Luxon, 23 May 1982

Alumni of the Guildhall School of Music and Drama
English operatic baritones
Commanders of the Order of the British Empire
People from Redruth
1937 births
Living people
People educated at Truro School
Honorary Members of the Royal Academy of Music
20th-century British  male opera singers